John Davies was an English professional footballer who played for Portsmouth, Scunthorpe United and Walsall.

Honours
with Walsall
Football League Fourth Division champion: 1959–60

References

English footballers
Association football wingers
Portsmouth F.C. players
Scunthorpe United F.C. players
Walsall F.C. players
English Football League players
Living people
Year of birth missing (living people)